GeneTex is a life science, biotechnology company that develops, licenses, and sells a product catalog of research reagents related to the study of the biomedical sciences. The company provides antibodies and proteins for use by academic and industry investigators involved in basic and translational research in biology and medicine.

In 2016, Genetex together with antibody research companies Novus Biologicals, R&D Systems, and Atlas Antibodies joined the International Working Group on Antibody Validation (IWGAV) with the intention to help standardize best practices in antibody validation.

Recombinant monoclonal antibody technology 
GeneTex has incorporated recombinant monoclonal antibody technology into its product development platform. This technology has numerous well-documented advantages, with consistency of performance being of paramount significance. The protocol employed is a multi-parameter FACS-based approach to isolate antigen-specific memory B cells from an immunized animal, with subsequent cloning of the antibody variable-region genes into an IgG backbone and expression in mammalian cells. The entire development procedure can be completed in weeks.

References

Biotechnology companies of the United States